Lance Comfort (11 August 1908 – 25 August 1966) was an English film director. In a career spanning over 25 years, he became one of the most prolific film directors in Britain, though he never gained critical attention and remained on the fringes of the film industry, creating mostly B movies.

Comfort carried on working almost right up to his death in Worthing, Sussex, in 1966. He had four children: Edward (born 1929), James (born 1931), Anna (born 1934) and Jack (born 1936).

Filmography

Penn of Pennsylvania (1941)
Hatter's Castle (1942)
Those Kids from Town (1942)
Squadron Leader X (1943)
Escape to Danger (1943)
When We Are Married (1943)
Old Mother Riley Detective (1943)
Hotel Reserve (1944)
Great Day (1945)
Bedelia (1946)
Temptation Harbour (1947)
Daughter of Darkness (1948)
Silent Dust (1949)
Portrait of Clare (1950)
Douglas Fairbanks, Jr., Presents (1953–1957)
The Girl on the Pier (1953)
Bang! You're Dead (1954)
Eight O'Clock Walk (1954)
The Man in the Road (1956)
Face in the Night (1957)
Man from Tangier (1957)
At the Stroke of Nine (1957)
The Ugly Duckling (1959)
Make Mine a Million (1959)
The Breaking Point (1961)
Rag Doll (1961)
Pit of Darkness (1961)
The Painted Smile (1961)
Touch of Death (1961)
The Break (1962)
Tomorrow at Ten (1962) 
The Switch (1963)
Blind Corner (1963)
Live It Up! (also known as Sing and Swing in the U.S.) (1963)
Be My Guest (1965)
Devils of Darkness (1965)

Critical assessment
The film historians Steve Chibnall and Brian McFarlane praise Comfort's gifts "in the confident exercise of melodramatic impulses in the interests of illuminating character and relationship, in a decorative visual style to serve these impulses, and in giving their heads to string of dominant actors". They add that all of his films "are persuasive narratives, marked by absence of sentimentality and the whiff of human reality".

References

Further reading
McFarlane, Brian, Lance Comfort, British Film Makers series, Manchester, Manchester University Press, 2002.  and 
McFarlane, Brian, "Lance Comfort: melodrama and an honourable career", Journal of Popular British Cinema, 1, 1998

External links

lovefilm.com – a selected filmography 
Archive: Book Reviews, May 2001

English film directors
People from Harrow, London
1908 births
1966 deaths